The Northtrap Rocks are a small isolated group of rocks lying northwest of Cape Juncal, D'Urville Island, in the Joinville Island group. In association with Sauthtrap Rock, so named by United Kingdom Antarctic Place-Names Committee (UK-APC) in 1963 because the rocks are the northernmost of two features which should be avoided by vessels entering Antarctic Sound from the north.

Rock formations of the Joinville Island group